Marcel Costa (born 4 November 1978 in Guardiola de Berguedà) is a Spanish auto racing driver.

Career
Costa was the 2002 Spanish Formula Three Champion, yet after a season in the Spanish GT Series, where he was a class champion, Costa spent 2004 and 2005 in the motor racing wilderness, with just a win in the Barcelona 24 Hours to his credit. However, after the dismissal of Antonio García by BMW Team Italy-Spain (run by Roberto Ravaglia), a driver shoot-out was prepared for Costa and fellow Spaniard Ander Vilariño, which Costa won. In 2006 he competed for the works BMW Team Italy-Spain in the FIA World Touring Car Championship, with the all new BMW 320si. After a poor start to the season with no points scored, Costa was replaced in the team after just four rounds by experienced Dutch driver Duncan Huisman.

Racing record

Complete World Touring Car Championship results
(key) (Races in bold indicate pole position) (Races in italics indicate fastest lap)

References

External links

1978 births
Catalan racing drivers
Spanish racing drivers
World Touring Car Championship drivers
Euroformula Open Championship drivers
Living people

Formule Campus Renault Elf drivers
BMW M drivers
De Villota Motorsport drivers
La Filière drivers